Whitehorse/Cousins Airport  is an unpaved airstrip located in Whitehorse, Yukon, Canada,  northwest of the city centre between the Alaska Highway and the Yukon River. This airport has no services at all, and is used primarily as an emergency landing area and for local pilot training. Vehicles enter via Cousins Access Road. The airport was built to support the Alaska Highway construction and the Northwest Staging Route.

See also
Whitehorse International Airport

References

External links
Yukon Government Airports/Aerodromes

Registered aerodromes in Yukon
Transport in Whitehorse